Death domain-containing protein CRADD is a protein that in humans is encoded by the CRADD gene.

Function 

The protein encoded by this gene is a death domain (CARD/DD)-containing protein and has been shown to induce cell apoptosis. Through its CARD domain, this protein interacts with, and thus recruits, caspase 2/ICH1 to the cell death signal transduction complex that includes tumor necrosis factor receptor 1 (TNFR1A), RIPK1/RIP kinase, and numbers of other CARD domain-containing proteins.

Interactions 

CRADD has been shown to interact with RIPK1 and Caspase 2.

References

External links

Further reading